Paranerita irma is a moth of the subfamily Arctiinae. It was described by William Schaus in 1920. It is found in Guatemala.

References

Paranerita
Moths described in 1920